Valek Airport  is a small airport in Krasnoyarsk krai, Russia located 9 km northeast of Norilsk along the Valkovskoye highway. The runway lies on the West bank of the Norilsk river. The airport is named for the nearby Valёk river, which is a tributary of the Norilsk river.

History
Beginning in 1950 to support the industrial giant now known as Norilsk Nickel, the Nadezhda Airport began as a Class 3 facility in the Civil Air Fleet with a Seaplane Base "Valek".

Small planes, such as the AN-2, AN-3, and similar types, and helicopters of all types are serviced at Valёk. The Taimyr Air Company services AN-2, AN-3, Mi-8 T (Mil Mi-8), and Mi-8 MTV-1 Line (Mil Mi-17).

Both Taymyr Air Company and NordStar are subsidiaries of Norilsk Nickel. On December 1, 2011, Norilsk Nickel announced that Taimyr Air Company will be merged with NordStar.

Nearest airports and the distance to them:

Alykel - 41.2 km
Dudinka - 86.0 km
Snezhnogorsk - 150.0 km

Satellite imagery from Google Earth on 2014-06-25 shows large areas of the runway inundated with water from the river, leaving approximately 400 Meters available.  Another image from 2015-06-23 shows the same state.  Four small propeller airplanes are shown parked in the same location in both picture.  An image from 2016-07-15 show the waters receded, runway areas covered with silt, with only one of the four airplanes parked.  Some water had returned in the summer of 2017, shown in an image from 2017-07-11.  An image from 2018-07-14 shows areas of the runway appear to remain inoperable due to water in low lying pools, leaving perhaps 800 Meters hypothetically available.  Parked helicopters have varied throughout these years of images, giving the impression this airport now mostly, or entirely, serves vertical Take Off/Landing or STOL aircraft.

References

External links
  Taimyr Air Company (Taymyr Aviakompaniya) former official website
  NordStar official website for Taymyr Air Company

Airports built in the Soviet Union
Airports in Krasnoyarsk Krai
Norilsk